HD 60863 is a class B8V (blue main-sequence) star in the constellation Puppis. Its apparent magnitude is 4.65 and it is approximately 222 light years away based on parallax.

In addition to the primary, there are distant companions B, at magnitude 9.13 and separation 36.9", and C, at magnitude 10.44 and separation from B of 43.1".

References

Puppis
B-type main-sequence stars
Binary stars
060863
2822
Puppis, p
CD-28 4566
036917